Surono (born 8 July 1955), who is often called Mbah Rono (Javanese for Grandfather Rono), is an Indonesian geophysicist and volcanologist. He was the Head of the Indonesian Center of Volcanology and Geological Hazard Mitigation ("Pusat Vulkanologi dan Mitigasi Bencana Geologi"). Currently, he is the Head of the Indonesian Geological Agency of the Ministry of Energy and Mineral Resources.

After graduating from the Bandung Institute of Technology in 1982 with a bachelor's degree in physics, he studied at Grenoble University in France. He graduated from the University of Savoy, Chambéry in 1993 with a doctorate degree in geophysics. He became the Head of Physical Volcanology at the Volcano Analysis Division Volcanological Survey in Indonesia in 1993. In 2001 he became the head of the Geological Hazard Mitigation Division Volcanology and Geological Hazard Mitigation. In 2006, he was appointed as the Head of the PVMBG, and in 2014 he became the Head of the Indonesian Geological Agency.

International Publications
 Lesage, P., Surono, 1995. Seismic precursors of the February 10, 1990 eruption of Kelut volcano, Java. Journal of Volcanology and Geothermal Research, 65(135-146).
 Surono, Jousset, P., Pallister, J., Boichu, M., Buongiorno, M.F., Budisantoso, A., Costa, F., Andreastuti, S., Prata, F., Schneider, D., Clarisse, L., Humaida, H., Sumarti, S., Bignami, C., Griswold, J., Carn, S., Oppenheimer, C., Lavigne, F., 2012. The 2010 explosive eruption of Java's Merapi volcano—A ‘100-year’ event. Journal of Volcanology and Geothermal Research, 241-242(121-135).
 Syahbana, D. K., Caudron, C., Jousset, P., Lecocq, T., Camelbeeck, T., Bernard, A., Surono, 2014. Fluid dynamics inside a “wet” volcano inferred from the complex frequencies of long-period (LP) events: An example from Papandayan volcano, West Java, Indonesia, during the 2011 seismic unrest. Journal of Volcanology and Geothermal Research, 280(76-89).

References
 Dr. Surono. Geophysicist, Centre for Volcanology and Geological Hazard Mitigation (CVGHM). School on Internet Asia Project.
 Dr. Surono was sworn in as a new Head of Geological Agency, Ministry of Energy and Mineral Resources. Recent news from the webpage of the Indonesian Geological Agency.

1955 births
Living people
Volcanologists
Bandung Institute of Technology alumni
Université Savoie-Mont Blanc alumni
Indonesian geologists